HD 145377 b is an extrasolar planet located approximately 180 light-years away This planet was discovered on October 26, 2008 by Moutou et al. using the HARPS spectrograph on ESO's 3.6 meter telescope installed at La Silla Observatory in Atacama desert, Chile.

See also 

 BD-17°63 b
 HD 131664
 HD 143361 b
 HD 147513 b
 HD 153950 b
 HD 20868 b
 HD 43848
 HD 48265 b
 HD 73267 b

References

External links 

 

Exoplanets discovered in 2008
Giant planets
Scorpius (constellation)
Exoplanets detected by radial velocity